Fonso (1877–1903) was an American Thoroughbred racehorse and was the winner of the 1880 Kentucky Derby under jockey George Garret Lewis. Fonso was bred in Kentucky and was a chestnut colt sired by King Alfonso out of the mare Weatherwitch.

Fonso won the Phoenix Stakes as a three-year-old over Luke Blackburn who finished third, but is best remembered for going on to beat the favored Kimball in the 1880 Kentucky Derby. The track was particularly dry and the dust, up to 5 inches thick, Fonso kicked up obscured the path for the other contenders. Fonso finished the race with a one length lead at a time of 2:37.50 and won $3800. The owner of Kimball called a foul in the race against Fonso, but the placing was not altered. Fonso had a career record of 12 starts, 5 wins, 3 places and 2 shows.

Fonso died at the age of 26 while standing as stud at the Oakwood Stud Farm in Lexington, Kentucky in 1903. His most notable offspring was the mare Fondling (br. 1886, out of Kitty Heron by Chillicothe), who produced the champion filly Imp.

Pedigree

References

1877 racehorse births
1903 racehorse deaths
Racehorses trained in the United States
Racehorses bred in Kentucky
Kentucky Derby winners
Thoroughbred family 24